Tammy Clarkson is an Australian award-winning television actress.

Career
She is best known as her role in The Circuit, in which she plays 'Bella Noble'. This series aired on SBS in 2007 for season one, and in late 2009 for season two.

Filmography

Awards
Clarkson has won one award, and been nominated for a further two awards for her role in The Circuit. The awards are:

WON: 
 2008 Logies: Graham Kennedy Award for Outstanding New Talent

Nominated: 
 2007 AFI Awards: Best Lead Actress in Television Drama
 2008 Logies: Most Popular New Talent – Female

References
 

Living people
21st-century Australian actresses
Australian television actresses
Indigenous Australian actresses
Logie Award winners
Year of birth missing (living people)